Pempelia albicostella is a species of snout moth. It is found on Cyprus.

The wingspan is about 14 mm.

References

Moths described in 1958
Phycitini